The Screen Actors Guild Award for Outstanding Performance by a Male Actor in a Television Movie or Limited Series is an award given by the Screen Actors Guild to honor the finest acting achievements in Miniseries or Television Movie.

Winners and nominees

1990s

2000s

2010s

2020s
{| class="wikitable" width="87%" cellpadding="5"
|-
! width=="7%"| Year
! width="31%"| Nominee
! width="31%"| Miniseries or Movie
! width="31%"| Role(s)
|-
| rowspan="5" align="center"| 2020
(27th) 
| style="background:#FAEB86;"| Mark Ruffalo
| style="background:#FAEB86;"| I Know This Much Is True
| style="background:#FAEB86;"| Dominick and Thomas Birdsey
|-
| Bill Camp
| The Queen's Gambit
| William Shaibel
|-
| Daveed Diggs
| Hamilton
| Marquis de Lafayette/Thomas Jefferson
|-
| Hugh Grant
| The Undoing
| Jonathan Fraser
|-
| Ethan Hawke
| The Good Lord Bird
| John Brown
|-
| rowspan="5" align="center"| 2021
(28th) 
| style="background:#FAEB86;"| Michael Keaton 
| style="background:#FAEB86;"| Dopesick
| style="background:#FAEB86;"| Dr. Samuel Finnix
|-
| Murray Bartlett
| The White Lotus
| Armond
|-
| Oscar Isaac
| Scenes from a Marriage| Jonathan Levy
|-
| Ewan McGregor 
| Halston| Halston
|-
| Evan Peters 
| Mare of Easttown| Colin Zabel
|-
| rowspan="5" align="center"| 2022
(29th) 
| style="background:#FAEB86;"| Sam Elliott || style="background:#FAEB86;"| 1883 || style="background:#FAEB86;"| Shea Brennan
|-
|Steve Carell||The Patient|| Alan Strauss
|-
|Taron Egerton||Black Bird||James "Jimmy" Keane
|-
|Paul Walter Hauser ||Black Bird || Lawrence "Larry" Hall
|-
||Evan Peters ||Dahmer – Monster: The Jeffrey Dahmer Story ||Jeffrey Dahmer
|}

Trivia
Multiple winners
 2 wins
 Paul Giamatti (John Adams, Too Big to Fail)
 Al Pacino (Angels in America, You Don't Know Jack)
 Gary Sinise (Truman, George Wallace)
 Mark Ruffalo (The Normal Heart, I Know This Much Is True)

Multiple nominees
Note: Winners are indicated in bold type.

 2 nominations
 Alec Baldwin (A Streetcar Named Desire, Nuremberg )
 Benedict Cumberbatch (Sherlock: His Last Vow, Sherlock: The Lying Detective)
 Robert Duvall (Broken Trail, The Man Who Captured Eichmann)
 Laurence Fishburne (The Tuskegee Airmen, Thurgood)
 Paul Giamatti (John Adams, Too Big to Fail)
 Hugh Grant (A Very English Scandal, The Undoing)
 Michael Keaton (The Company, Dopesick)
 Kevin Kline (As You Like It, Great Performances: Cyrano de Bergerac)
 Jack Lemmon (12 Angry Men, Tuesdays with Morrie)
 Ray Liotta (The Rat Pack, Texas Rising)
 Paul Newman (Empire Falls, Our Town)
 Evan Peters (Mare of Easttown, Dahmer-Monster: The Jeffrey Dahmer Story)
 Mark Ruffalo (The Normal Heart, I Know This Much Is True)
 Geoffrey Rush (The Life and Death of Peter Sellers, Genius)
 George C. Scott (12 Angry Men, Inherit the Wind)
 Patrick Stewart (A Christmas Carol, Macbeth)
 Forest Whitaker (Deacons for Defense, The Enemy Within)
 Tom Wilkinson (John Adams, A Number)
 James Woods (Dirty Pictures, Too Big To Fail)

 3 nominations
 James Garner (Legalese, The Rockford Files: A Blessing in Disguise, The Rockford Files: I Still Love L.A.)
 Ed Harris (Riders of the Purple Sage, Empire Falls, Game Change)
 Jeremy Irons (Elizabeth I, Georgia O'Keeffe, The Hollow Crown)
 Ben Kingsley (Anne Frank: The Whole Story, The Tale of Sweeney Todd, Tut)
 William H. Macy (Door to Door, Nightmares and Dreamscapes, The Wool Cap)
 Al Pacino (Angels in America, You Don't Know Jack, Phil Spector)
 Gary Sinise (The Stand, Truman, George Wallace)
 John Turturro (The Bronx Is Burning, Monday Night Mayhem, The Night Of'')

See also
 Primetime Emmy Award for Outstanding Lead Actor in a Limited Series or Movie
 Primetime Emmy Award for Outstanding Supporting Actor in a Limited Series or Movie
 Golden Globe Award for Best Actor – Miniseries or Television Film
 Golden Globe Award for Best Supporting Actor – Series, Miniseries or Television Film
 Critics' Choice Television Award for Best Actor in a Movie/Miniseries
 Critics' Choice Television Award for Best Supporting Actor in a Movie/Miniseries

External links 
 SAG Awards official site

Male Actor Miniseries
 
Television awards for Best Actor